Joseph William Bache (8 February 1880 – 10 November 1960), was an English footballer who played for Aston Villa.

Joe Bache was a prolific centre forward for Aston Villa between 1900 and 1919. He played for the England national team seven times, and during that period scored four goals for his country, one in each of his first four appearances.

He was one of Aston Villa's all-time greatest forwards, enjoying a successful career at the club, winning an FA Cup winners medal in both 1905 and 1913. He was also a vital part of the Villa team that won the League Championship in 1910. Bache appeared for the team 474 times and had scored a total of 185 goals at the end of his career.

Bache joined the Royal Garrison Artillery during the First World War and went on to serve on the Western Front, where he rose to the rank of Lance-Corporal. Despite being involved in a number of actions, Bache survived the war and returned home after the 1918 armistice to resume his playing career.

After spending 1919–20 in South Wales with Mid Rhondda, Bache made a brief comeback as player/coach for Grimsby Town in 1920, playing five games, scoring once.

His son, David Bache became a famous car designer, producing many designs, mainly for Rover.

References

External links
Player profile at Aston Villa Players Database
Player Profile at Football and the First World War

Aston Villa F.C. players
Grimsby Town F.C. players
English footballers
England international footballers
Association football forwards
Sportspeople from Stourbridge
1880 births
1960 deaths
English Football League players
Mid Rhondda F.C. players
English Football League representative players
Royal Garrison Artillery soldiers
FA Cup Final players
British Army personnel of World War I
Military personnel from Worcestershire